Taufa Funaki (born 29 July 2000 in New Zealand) is a New Zealand rugby union player who plays for Auckland in the National Provincial Championship. His playing position is Half-back.

Reference list

External links
itsrugby.co.uk profile

2000 births
New Zealand rugby union players
Living people
Rugby union scrum-halves
Auckland rugby union players
Blues (Super Rugby) players